Albert Henrik Krohn Balchen (8 October 1825 – 12 November 1908) was a Norwegian priest and politician for the Conservative Party.

He was a vicar in Sarpsborg when being elected to represent the city in the Parliament of Norway, in the elections of 1868, 1870 and 1873. Following a parliamentary hiatus, as dean of Larvik he elected to represent Larvik and Sandefjord in the 1885 and 1888 Norwegian parliamentary election.

References

1825 births
1908 deaths
People from Sarpsborg
People from Larvik
Norwegian priests
Norwegian priest-politicians
Members of the Storting
Conservative Party (Norway) politicians
Mayors of places in Hedmark